is a railway station on the Minobu Line of Central Japan Railway Company (JR Central) located in the city of Fujinomiya, Shizuoka Prefecture, Japan. The station is noted for its view of Mount Fuji, which has inspired a number of poets. Opposite the station is a stone monument with a poem by Kyoshi Takahama, composed on this location.

Lines
Numakubo Station is served by the Minobu Line and is located 16.9 kilometers from the southern terminus of the line at Fuji Station.

Layout
Numakubo Station has one side platform serving a single bi-directional track. The platform has a small wooden shelter, but there is no station building. The station is unattended and has automated ticket machines and an automated turnstile.

Adjacent stations

History
Numakubo Station was opened on August 15, 1929 as part of the original Minobu Line. It came under control of the Japanese Government Railways (JGR) on May 1, 1941. The JGR became the Japan National Railway (JNR) after the end of World War II. Along with the division and privatization of JNR on April 1, 1987, the station came under the control and operation of the Central Japan Railway Company.

Passenger statistics
In fiscal 2017, the station was used by an average of 7 passengers daily (boarding passengers only).

Surrounding area
 Fuji River

See also
 List of railway stations in Japan

References

External links

  Minobu Line station information	

Railway stations in Japan opened in 1929
Railway stations in Shizuoka Prefecture
Minobu Line
Fujinomiya, Shizuoka